The Jokers is a 1967 British comedy film written by Dick Clement and Ian La Frenais, and directed by Michael Winner. The film stars Michael Crawford and Oliver Reed as brothers who hatch a plot to steal the Crown Jewels.

Very much of its time – "Swinging London" – the film makes great use of London locations. Included was a short sequence of Jezebel, a 1916 Dennis N-Type fire engine that is still owned and run by the Royal College of Science Union at Imperial College London.

Plot
Michael Tremayne is booted out of Sandhurst. He and his brother David want to do something "big". They decide to commit a crime as a "grand gesture". The brothers take Inge, David's new inamorata, on a tour of London, including the Tower of London. At a dinner party they learn that you cannot be charged with theft unless you intend to permanently deprive the owner of their property. David proposes stealing the crown jewels and sending letters out beforehand, showing they aren't intending to permanently deprive. Michael is somewhat jealous of David, as David is considered the ‘good’ son and him the ‘bad’ son. They write and deliver the letters. They plant a bomb at the Albert Memorial and observe the police procedure. Next they put a bomb at the lion cage at the London zoo. Then they blow up a ladies lavatory. David gets a laser. They put a bomb at the stock exchange and David goes to the army base, and using a tape recorder records the procedures.

Finally the day comes. Michael goes to the jewel room in the Tower and hides a bomb there. David and Michael go to the base and tie up the duty officer. They take the place of the bomb disposal expert and his assistant. They ride with the army to the Tower. The pair go into the bomb room and knock out the rather silly Colonel who went in with them and who commands the  army base. David and Michael have had the alarms turned off, due to the danger of "vibration", and use the laser to cut into the cabinets and steal the Crown Jewels. The pair set off a small bomb and a smoke bomb. They stagger out pretending to be hurt, then escape from the ambulance taking them to hospital along with the jewels.

A worldwide search is undertaken for the robbers. David and Michael enjoy the media frenzy. One week after the robbery on 23 June 1967, the letters are opened and delivered to the police. When they go to get the jewels from their hiding place they are not there. The police arrive to arrest David. Michael says he doesn't know anything about the robbery. Michael never delivered his letter. David is identified as the bomb expert, but the witnesses can't identify Michael. The police investigate, but can't break down Michael's alibi of being at a party. Michael is released. David is indicted and bail is refused. The police set up a plan to make Michael think his alibi is breaking down, but Michael evades police surveillance. We then see him digging up the jewels from where he buried them at Stonehenge. Michael calls on a telephone he knows is tapped to say he's returning the jewels at Trafalgar Square at 4 a.m. The police set up a cordon, but Michael uses their concentration on the square to put the jewels in the scales of justice on top of the Old Bailey. We close with both brothers imprisoned in the Tower, plotting their escape.

Cast
 Michael Crawford as Michael Tremayne 
 Oliver Reed as David Tremayne 
 Harry Andrews as Superintendent Marryatt 
 James Donald as Colonel Gurney-Simms 
 Daniel Massey as Riggs 
 Michael Hordern as Sir Matthew 
 Gabriella Licudi as Eve 
 Lotte Tarp as Inge 
 Frank Finlay as Harassed man 
 Warren Mitchell as Lennie 
 Rachel Kempson as Mrs. Tremayne 
 Peter Graves as Mr. Tremayne 
 Ingrid Boulting as Sarah 
 Brian Wilde as Sergeant Catchpole 
 Edward Fox as Lieutenant Sprague 
 Michael Goodliffe as Lieutenant Colonel Paling

Filming
The film was shot on location in London over nine weeks in the summer of 1966. Filming started 23 June 1966.

Critical reception
Bosley Crowther in The New York Times wrote, "ANOTHER of those wonderfully eccentric British crime comedies, to compare with such whoppers as "The League of Gentlemen, Private's Progress and The Lavender Hill Mob, has popped up in Universal's The Jokers, which came to the Sutton yesterday. And right away its young director, Michael Winner, justifies his name."

References

External links
 

1967 films
1960s crime comedy films
1960s heist films
British crime comedy films
British heist films
1960s English-language films
Films directed by Michael Winner
Films set in London
Films shot in London
Films with screenplays by Dick Clement
Films with screenplays by Ian La Frenais
1967 comedy films
Films with screenplays by Michael Winner
1960s British films